The Turn of the Screw is a 1974 American made-for-television horror film directed by Dan Curtis based on the 1898 novella of the same name by Henry James. The film aired on ABC on April 15, 1974.

Plot
An English governess is hired to take care of two children whose parents have died. Orphaned herself at a young age, the governess begins to believe that the orphans are communicating with the ghosts of the previous governess and her lover.

Cast
 Lynn Redgrave as Miss Jane Cubberly
 John Barron as Mr. Fredricks
 Eva Griffith as Flora
 Jasper Jacob as Miles
 Megs Jenkins as Mrs. Grose
 Anthony Langdon as Luke (credited as Anthony Lagdon)
 James Laurenson as Peter Quint
 Kathryn Leigh Scott as Miss Jessel
 Benedict Taylor as Timothy

Production
The film was shot in London, England.

Broadcast
The film was first broadcast in the USA on April 15, 1974.

Reception
In an article for the journal e-Rea, author Dennis Tready writes that the film "would have to be considered a landmark teleplay adaptation. Dan Curtis had long been intrigued by James’s short story, Archibald’s stage play and especially Clayton’s film, to such a point that he admits that 'The Turn of the Screw' had a major influence on many episodes of his famous suspense series Dark Shadows."

M. Grant Kellermeyer of oldstyletales.com named it the seventh-best adaptation of the novella, writing that the adaptation "positively drips with the pleasantly campy atmosphere that made 'Dark Shadows' a Gothic icon. [...] Cold, stark, and soapy, this is by no means a high-production masterpiece, but is in many ways among the creepiest adaptations I've seen."

Reviewer Jane Nightshade of horrornews.net called it "a surprisingly good made-for-TV movie" and wrote that "there are flickering candles, over-sized shadows, odd camera angles, secret casks of letters, and portentous musical cues galore. It can all get a bit tedious, but Curtis knows his horror, and inserts a good chill just when the numerous shots of Redgrave wandering in the darkness with a candle start to drag. Full marks to the child actors, Griffith as Flora and Jacob as Miles, with Jacob offering a somewhat different take on Miles (who's been upgraded in the script to teenage status): more sexually knowledgeable, more obnoxious, and more sinister."

See also
 List of American films of 1974

References

External links
 

1970s American films
1970s horror thriller films
1970s thriller drama films
1974 drama films
1974 films
1974 horror films
1974 television films
American horror television films
American horror thriller films
American thriller drama films
Films based on The Turn of the Screw
Films shot in London